The Attorney-General is a political and legal officer in New Zealand. The Attorney-General is simultaneously a ministerial position and the chief law officer of the Crown, and has responsibility for supervising New Zealand law and advising the government on legal matters. The Attorney-General serves both a political and apolitical function. The current Attorney-General is David Parker.

Responsibilities and powers
The Attorney-General has two main areas of official responsibility. Firstly, the Attorney-General has ministerial jurisdiction over the Crown Law Office, the Parliamentary Counsel Office, and the Serious Fraud Office. Secondly, the Attorney-General is the principal law officer of the Crown, responsible for supervising the state's administration of the law and for providing legal advice to the government. This includes upholding the rule of law and advising on compliance with domestic and international obligations. In the latter role (but strictly not in the former), the Attorney-General is assisted by the Solicitor-General, a non-partisan official. This is to reduce the extent to which the Attorney-General's actions on behalf of the state (as opposed to the government) can be influenced by their political allegiance.

A more complete description of the Attorney-General's powers can be found in the briefings to the incoming Attorney-General prepared by the Crown Law Office (most recently in 2020).

At present, there is no statutory basis which establishes the office of Attorney-General, although the position is referenced by a number of other legal documents, such as the Constitution Act 1986 which allows the Solicitor-General to exercise the functions of the Attorney-General. The functions of the Attorney-General are also described in the Cabinet Manual.

There is no constitutional duty on the government to follow the advice of the law officers. The Cabinet Manual outlines the process by which the legal advice provided by the Attorney-General (and others) may be disclosed.

The Attorney-General is also responsible for advising the Governor-General on who should be appointed judges of the courts of New Zealand.

History
The post of Attorney-General has existed since the separation of New Zealand as a distinct Crown Colony from New South Wales. It is a distinct position from that of Minister of Justice, although the two posts are sometimes held by the same person, for example, Martyn Finlay who held both positions from 1972 to 1975.

Historically, the post could be held either by a politician or by a senior jurist, but today, it is invariably held by a member of Parliament. The Attorney-General is a member of the Executive Council and is usually appointed as a member of the Cabinet. (An exception is when David Lange was appointed Attorney-General outside Cabinet from 1989 to 1990.)

By tradition, persons appointed to the position of Attorney-General have been lawyers. Only two former Attorneys-General have not been lawyers, most recently Dr. Michael Cullen who held the post in 2005 and again from 2006 to 2008. In November 1906, when Albert Pitt died, there were no suitable members of the legal profession in Parliament. Hence Joseph Ward appointed John Findlay to the Legislative Council on 23 November 1906 and appointed him Attorney-General and Colonial Secretary on the same day.

The table below is an incomplete listing of New Zealand politicians who have held political appointment as Attorney-General since 1856. It does not show non-political attorneys-general. There were two previous Attorneys-General before responsible government was introduced in New Zealand in 1856: Francis Fisher who held office for less than one year in 1841, and William Swainson who held office until 7 May 1856. Peter Wilkinson was the half-brother of his successor, Jim McLay.

List of attorneys-general
Key

External links
Ministerial Briefing describing the role of the Attorney-General

References 

Politics of New Zealand
Lists of government ministers of New Zealand
Prosecution
 
1856 establishments in New Zealand